Maksim Anatolyevich Chistyakov (born 25 September 1986) is a Russian former football player.

References

1986 births
Footballers from Voronezh
Living people
Russian footballers
FC Rotor Volgograd players
Russian Premier League players
FC Fakel Voronezh players
Association football midfielders
FC Rostov players
PFC Krylia Sovetov Samara players